The Spata Training Centre is the name given to AEK Athens' training complex, located outside Athens in Spata near Athens International Airport. Also hosting the club's youth academy, the facility replaced the old Thrakomakedones Training Centre, which was in use until 2010.

History
The new architecturally designed AEK Training Centre has been built since 2010 and it is located in Spata, Attica. It is the home of the club's team and academy and is recognized as one of the best in the Balkans.

The modern facility - which includes two natural grass pitches, an artificial pitch, world-class player preparation areas, pool and hydrotherapy complex, altitude room, large-scale gymnasium and specialist sports rehabilitation suites - will support the club's ambitions to attract, develop and retain the highest quality talent.

Dimitris Melissanidis recently managed to buy another 70 acres of land at this area, in order to enlarge the Training Centre of AEK, by constructing more football fields and buildings for the hospitality of team's footballers.

Since 2014, the official name of the ground is "OPAP Sports Centre". On 4 July 2018, the Sports Centre came to auction which was bought by Dimitris Melissanidis for a price of €3.5m and then donated it to AEK. Alongside the Sports Centre, Melissanidis also bought 70 hectares for an extra €5.5m which were added to the wider area of the existing training center and there will be additional stadiums along with the necessary additional facilities for the preparation of the team and for the hospitality of the players.

References

External links
Inside look at AEK Athens training facility

Sports venues in Athens
AEK Athens F.C.
AEK Athens
Sports venues completed in 2010
2010 establishments in Greece